Pirates of the Barbary Coast is a maritime trading and strategy video game set in the days of the Barbary corsairs, published in 1986 for Atari 8-bit, Atari ST, and Commodore 64 by StarSoft Development Laboratories. In 1987, it was also published by Keypunch Software for DOS, while Cascade Games published versions for the other platforms in Europe.

Plot
The player takes on the role of the captain of the merchant ship American Star in 1798. During a stopover in Casablanca, when the captain goes ashore, the ship is attacked by the pirate Bloodthroat, who kidnaps the player's daughter Katherine and demands a ransom in gold within thirty days. The player must raise the sum by trading along the Mediterranean and Atlantic coasts of the Barbary States and fighting other pirates. Bloodthroat's hideout is on an unknown island, and the player will have to find clues to its location in order to eventually pay the ransom or face him in battle.

Gameplay

Pirates of the Barbary Coast interface is menu-driven, controlled with a pointer. The general map shows seven ports in North Africa and some islands in the Atlantic. Navigation to the selected destination is automatic and takes a number of days of game time. The condition of the ship and crew must be taken into account, especially care must be taken not to run out of food.

In each port it is possible to buy and sell goods (wool, silk, rum, tobacco, etc.) at prices that vary with location and time. The actual price can be haggled, but if the player pushes too hard, the local merchant may get impatient and will refuse to deal with the player. In addition, it is always possible to commission repairs, stock up on ammunition and food, and buy information.

While sailing from one port to another, the player's ship may be attacked by pirates, leading to a real-time action sequence. The enemy ship slowly passes in front of the player's 15 cannons, shown one at a time from behind. In order to fire it is first necessary to select the elements in the right order with the pointer, to perform the realistic loading operations: inserting and pressing powder, inserting ball, brushing barrel. To fire, the player must select a cannon and adjust the elevation. If the opponent is defeated, there is a choice between seizing its gold or the captain's log, which contains information.

Reception
Pirates of the Barbary Coast received mixed reviews. Your Commodore reviewer praised the large, colorful graphics, but complained that the game was slow to play and a bit difficult to control. Zzap!64 review summed up the game as a noble attempt at a budget disk game, unfortunately let down by the lack of depth and variety.

References

External links
Pirates of the Barbary Coast for Atari 8-bit at Atari Mania
Pirates of the Barbary Coast for Atari ST at Atari Mania
Review in Computer and Video Games
Review in Commodore User

1986 video games
Atari 8-bit family games
Atari ST games
Commodore 64 games
DOS games
Video games about pirates
Video games developed in the United States
Video games set in Algeria
Video games set in Cape Verde
Video games set in Libya
Video games set in Morocco
Video games set in Portugal
Video games set in Spain
Video games set in Tunisia
Video games set in the 18th century